I Can't Wait may refer to:

Albums
 I Can't Wait (EP), by Yngwie Malmsteen, or the title song, 1994
 I Can't Wait, by Sanchez, 1991

Songs
 "I Can't Wait" (Akon song), 2008
 "I Can't Wait" (Brooke McClymont song), 2002
 "I Can't Wait" (Nu Shooz song), 1985
 "I Can't Wait" (Stevie Nicks song), 1985
 "I Can't Wait", by Celldweller from Wish Upon a Blackstar, 2011
 "I Can't Wait", by KeKe Wyatt from Soul Sista, 2001
 "I Can't Wait", by Kelly Osbourne from Sleeping in the Nothing, 2005
 "I Can't Wait", by Mudvayne from Mudvayne, 2009
 "I Can't Wait", by Ol' Dirty Bastard from Nigga Please, 1999
 "I Can't Wait", by Sleepy Brown and Outkast from the Barbershop 2: Back in Business soundtrack
 "I Can't Wait", by the Sundays from Static & Silence, 1997
 "I Can't Wait", by Twin Shadow from Forget, 2010
 "I Can't Wait", by the White Stripes from White Blood Cells, 2001

See also
 "I Can't Wait Another Minute", a song by Hi-Five, 1991
 "Can't Wait", a song by Redman, 1995
 "Can't Wait", a song by Bob Dylan from Time Out of Mind, 1997
 "Can't Wait", a song by Foreigner from Inside Information, 1987